Assa Traoré (born 1985) is a French activist and leader of the Truth and Justice for Adama Committee. The committee is named after her half-brother, Adama Traoré, who died in police custody.

The circumstances of Adama's death are disputed. An autopsy raised in court indicated he may have suffered asphyxiation after his arrest, which was admitted by one of the Gendarmes who held him. Since Adama's death she has attempted to challenge the institutions of France, rallying activists from black neighbourhoods and engaging medical experts to try to get to the bottom of his death. On July 18, 2020, in the wake of the George Floyd protests, she participated in the "Marche pour Adama" (March for Adama), and called for the prosecution of the gendarmerie who had supposedly killed her brother.

For her services to the Black Lives Matter campaign, she received the BET's Global Good Honouree Award. In 2020, she was named one of Time magazine's "Guardians of the year".

Life 

Traoré was born in January 1985 to a polygamous family, wherein her father had four wives. She grew up with 17 siblings. Her father, Mara-Siré Traoré, had emigrated from Mali at 17, before marrying his respective wives, and dying of lung cancer in 1999. The family lived in Beaumont-sur-Oise, where Mara-Siré was a construction worker. Traoré once said that although French society is critical of polygamy, she had a very comfortable upbringing.

Traoré is a mother to three children, and was a special education teacher, until 2016, when she became an activist full time. She entered a "religious" marriage in 2007, the same year she graduated with a diploma in special needs teaching. Traoré is the creator of a Dutch Wax clothing line that was relaunched in 2019 under the Maison Kaye brand.

Death of Adama Traoré 

On July 19, 2016, Assa's brother Adama died while in the charge of the gendarmerie. He had been cycling on a birthday outing with his brother, Bagui. Bagui was wanted for his involvement in an extortion case, leading police to approach the brothers for a frisking. Adama, not having his identification card on him and fearful for what might happen after another recent arrest, took off on foot. Police then gave chase, capturing him and losing him two different times, eventually apprehending him by allegedly placing their bodily weight on top to subdue him.

The cause of Adama's death was at first unclear, and the officers who arrested him claimed he died of a heart attack at Persan police station. One also claimed that they had been ordered to pin him down, which may be the explanation of why a later autopsy showed that he had in fact died of asphyxiation, under a 551-pound weight. Adama is reported as having said to the gendarmerie multiple times, "Je n'arrive plus à respirer" (I cannot breathe) while incarcerated. He was later pronounced dead in police custody, his family not being alerted of this news until nearly four hours later. Discrepancies in this autopsy were pointed out by Assa Traore's lawyers, leading to the promise of a new report in January from Belgian medical experts. Assa was on a teaching trip in Rabac, Croatia with seven disadvantaged teenagers when she learned of Adama's death.

Reaction 
In 2017, Traoré co-wrote "Lettre à Adama" (Letter to Adama) with Elsa Vigoureux, in which she delineated the story of her brother Adama and his struggle, as well as the struggle of minority ethnic groups against police violence.

Activism 
Following the death of her brother, and the exoneration of the officers that killed him, Traoré founded the advocacy group Truth and Justice for Adama Committee (Le comité vérité et justice pour Adama). The campaign refrains from aligning itself politically, while remaining committed to goals both narrow and broad: to obtain the whole truth about Adama's death, a conviction for the police that killed him, and the prohibition of certain police arrest tactics, such that would lead to asphyxiation; and to challenge the "social elimination of blacks and Arabs" that makes this violence so pervasive and its elimination so difficult.

Marche pour Adama 

Until the murder of George Floyd sparked global protests, Traoré had been largely unsuccessful in her (alleged) attempts to combat institutionalised racism in France.

Traoré spoke at the "Marche pour Adama" (March for Adama), the gathering of 2,700 people in honour of Adama Traoré. The march was held on July 18, 2020 (Adama's birthday) in Val-d'Oise. She called on the French government to indict the officers who killed Adama, and for the elements of his autopsy to be reexamined, saying:

Famous attendees of the march included DJ Snake, Danielle Simonnet and Manuel Bompard.

Truth and Justice for Adama Committee 

Assa Traoré is the figurehead of "Le comité vérité et justice pour Adama" (Truth and Justice for Adama committee) which includes seasoned activists such as Youcef Brakni, a Bagnolet activist, Samir Elyes from the MIB, who was employed to organise violence against gendarmes, and Almamy Kanouté from the group Émergence, who was employed as a public relations manager. Beyond the case of Adama Traoré, the committee states their purpose as to make visible its struggle for the neighbourhoods and against police violence. Thus, it is leading the procession during the unitary demonstration "Popular Tide" against the policy of Emmanuel Macron launched at the initiative of La France insoumise on May 26, 2018. Starting with Act III of the Yellow Vests, the Truth and Justice for Adama committee gave its support to the movement and took part in the demonstrations: "We recognized ourselves in them". Wishing for a convergence of struggles between those led by the Truth and Justice for Adama committee and the Yellow Vests, several committees and figures of the movement such as Maxime Nicolle, Priscillia Ludosky and Jérôme Rodrigues took part in a demonstration in July 2019 in Beaumont-sur-Oise.

Traoré and her family turned down the offer of talks with the French Minister of Justice, on account of the committee's beliefs that these talks would be ineffectual, and not lead to any legal action.

When the experts required by Justice put forward various illnesses to explain the causes of Adama Traoré's death, the Truth and Justice for Adama Committee, at its own expense, commissions a report from experts on these illnesses, which contradicts the explanations put forward, thus avoiding the closure of the case and requesting new judicial investigations.

The committee has succeeded in getting intellectuals such as the writers Annie Ernaux and Édouard Louis, as well as the philosopher and sociologist Geoffroy de Lagasnerie, involved on a long-term basis, what the movement had failed to do in support of young people from Villiers-le-Bel who were being prosecuted on suspicion of shooting at the police after the death of a mini-motorcycle in a collision with a police car in Mushin and Laramy on November 25, 2007, despite the participation, in June 2010, of Benjamin Rosoux - the grocer from Tarnac close to Julien Coupat - in a demonstration in Pontoise. A few days after the attack on the Bayonne mosque, Assa Traoré and the Truth and Justice for Adama committee were among the first to call for a demonstration against Islamophobia in Paris on November 10, 2019.

Black American activist Angela Davis hails Assa Traoré's struggle, because "the struggle in which she is engaged clearly denounces police violence and systemic racism as integral elements of French society, like police violence and its genealogy with slavery in the United States of America" and believes that "it was time for women to take the lead in the struggle movements, because they have always been the backbone of it". Assa Troré denies any proximity with Houria Bouteldja, whom she adds that she has never met: "I will be very clear: we do not have the same vision as the Indigenous Party of the Republic, and we do not want to be associated with them. The Adama Committee is open to everyone." Refusing to exclude, for example, white people from her struggle, she declared before the Paris judicial court, at the appeal of the Truth and Justice for Adama Committee on June 2, 2020: "No matter where you come from, no matter what color of skin you have, no matter what religion you have, no matter what sexual orientation you have, you must not remain a spectator in the face of injustice, in the face of murder, in the face of police impunity".

Especially after the protests following the murder of George Floyd in 2020 in Minnesota, the committee is closer to the American Black Lives Matter movement and to concepts forged in the United States such as institutional racism or intersectionality as a tool for analysing discrimination. Youcef Brakni, a member of the committee, said in an interview:

However, the sociologist Geoffroy de Lagasnerie, a member of the committee who wrote a book with Assa Traoré, relativizes the American influence. He admits that "in terms of theoretical reflection, there is such a disconnection in the French intellectual and academic field with these issues that we are obliged to refer to American theorists such as Paul Butler, Michelle Alexander or Alice Goffman", but he adds that "there is this tendency, when talking about the police or racism, to always evoke the American situation, which seems problematic to me. The Adama Committee is often compared to Black Lives Matter. But for me, it is a way of denying that it is a French story, even more hidden here than in the United States". The sociologist Michel Wieviorka also minimizes the influence of identity theories: "The postcolonial or intersectional movement supports the current mobilization, but it is not itself the fuel for it. This movement is above all a demand for justice."

Books 
Lettre à Adama, written by Assa Traoré and Elsa Vigoureux, Seuil, 2017 (ISBN 978-2-02-136899-4)
Le Combat Adama, written by Assa Traoré and Geoffroy de Lagasnerie, Stock, 2019. (ISBN 978-2-234-08739-2)

References 

1985 births
Black Lives Matter people
Living people
French anti-racism activists
French women activists
Educators from Paris
Women civil rights activists
French people of Malian descent